Ricky Lopez-Espin (born December 2, 1995) is an American former soccer player.

Career

College
Lopez-Espin spent his entire college career at Creighton University.  He made a total of 74 appearances for the Bluejays and tallied 30 goals and 7 assists. During his senior year at Creighton, he was named USC First Team All-Great Lakes Region, Big East Conference Player of the Year, and First Team All-Big East Conference.

While at college, Lopez-Espin played for Premier Development League sides Lane United and Tampa Bay Rowdies U23.

Professional
On January 19, 2018, Lopez-Espin was selected 33rd overall in the 2018 MLS SuperDraft by the Real Salt Lake.

On March 24, he made his professional debut for Salt Lake's USL affiliate club Real Monarchs, appearing as an 85th-minute substitute in a 3–2 victory over Tulsa Roughnecks.

Lopez-Espin was released by Salt Lake at the end of their 2018 season. On December 12, 2018, Lopez-Espin was selected by Los Angeles FC in the MLS Waiver Draft.

On March 21, 2019, Lopez-Espin signed for Lansing Ignite. On June 26, 2019, Lopez and Lansing mutually terminated his contract.

Lopez-Espin spent a single season in USL League One with Fort Lauderdale CF during their 2020 season.

References

External links
 
 
 Creighton Bluejays bio
 

1995 births
Living people
American soccer players
Association football forwards
Creighton Bluejays men's soccer players
Inter Miami CF II players
Lane United FC players
Lansing Ignite FC players
Major League Soccer players
Real Monarchs players
Real Salt Lake draft picks
Real Salt Lake players
Soccer players from Miami
Tampa Bay Rowdies U23 players
USL Championship players
USL League One players
USL League Two players